Two Canadian naval units have been named HMCS Assiniboine.

 (I) was a River-class destroyer that served the Royal Canadian Navy during the Second World War.  She was formerly the Royal Navy's Interwar Standard C-class destroyer .
 was a  escort that served the Royal Canadian Navy and later the Canadian Forces during the Cold War.

Battle honours
Atlantic 1939-45
Biscay, 1944
English Channel 1944-45

Set index articles on ships
Royal Canadian Navy ship names